Agathon comstocki is a species of net-winged midges in the family Blephariceridae.

References

Blephariceridae
Articles created by Qbugbot
Insects described in 1903